Past Midnight is a 1991 Neo-noir thriller film (with slasher connections) starring Rutger Hauer and Natasha Richardson, as well as co-stars Tom Wright, Clancy Brown and Paul Giamatti (making his first credited screen appearance).

Plot
Parolee Ben Jordan has spent the past fifteen years behind bars for his pregnant wife's murder. He is monitored by his parole officer Lee Samuels and social worker Laura Mathews after he is released.  Mathews begins looking into his case and becomes convinced that he was convicted under circumstantial evidence and starts becoming convinced of his innocence in the crime. Before long she starts falling for him, but this is far from wise, since even if he is innocent, Mrs. Jordan's real murderer may soon come a calling.

Cast
 Rutger Hauer as Ben Jordan
 Natasha Richardson as Laura Mathews
 Paul Giamatti as Larry Canipe
 Clancy Brown as Steve Lundy
 Tom Wright as Lee Samuels
 Guy Boyd as Todd Canipe 
 Charles Boswell as Carlton Daniels
 Ernie Lively as Detective Allan Tobias
 Kibibi Monie as Dorothy Coleman
 Dana Eskelson as Kathy Tudor
 Ted D'Arms as Bill Tudor
 Krisha Fairchild as Dr. Zastoupil
 Sarah Magnuson as Gerrie Graymark
 David Frederick White (as Dave White) as Cop
 Brian Finney (as Brian T. Finney) as Delivery Man 
 Sue Morales as Social Worker (uncredited)

Production
After Quentin Tarantino significantly re-wrote the script, Catalaine Knell shared her associate producer credit with him on the film, his first official screen credit.

Release
Originally intended for a theatrical release, the film aired on the USA Network on December 16, 1992. Before, the film was shown at the American Film Market and at the Vancouver International Film Festival in October of the previous year. The movie was released on videocassette and laserdisc on April 21, 1993 by Columbia TriStar Home Video, and was released on DVD by the same company on August 17, 2004, in widescreen.

References

External links

American mystery thriller films
1990s mystery thriller films
American independent films
American neo-noir films
CineTel Films films
Films scored by Steve Bartek
1991 independent films
1991 films
1990s English-language films
1990s American films